Coleophora neobagorella is a moth of the family Coleophoridae. It is found in China.

References

neobagorella
Moths described in 1999
Moths of Asia